Bhusana Dvija (Born 1508 CE) was litterateur born in Dihga Nagara, Barnagar, Barpeta, Kamrup. He was specially known for his biographies named Guru Charita and Sankara Charita.

Bhusana Dvija was grandson of Chakrapani who was disciple of Sankardeva. He compiled Sankara charita with accounts mostly left by his ancestors of life of Sankardeva.

See also
 Bakul Kayastha
 Haribara Vipra

References

Kamrupi literary figures
1508 births
1577 deaths